Maia is a sci-fi strategy simulation video game developed by Simon Roth. The game has been described as "Dungeon Keeper meets Dwarf Fortress on a primordial alien world". Roth also cites Theme Hospital, The Sims, Black & White and Space Station 13 amongst its influences.

Gameplay
Players take control over the first human colony on the fictional planet of Maia in the Tau Ceti system.

Players will have to excavate an underground colony to escape the hostile surface of the world. They need to control a number of characters and robots to mine minerals for construction, build rooms to house, feed and entertain colonists, and construct intricate defences to protect them from dangerous wildlife.

The player's colony will face dangers including earthquakes, solar flares, meteor strikes, and hostile indigenous wildlife.

Funding
The game was crowdfunded, raising £140,480 via Kickstarter, and another $11,435 via Indiegogo. Including funds raised via Steam's Early Access programme, Roth stated the project had "grossed over half a million dollars in backer funding" by December 2013.

Release
An alpha version of the game was made available to people who have pre-ordered the game in August 2013. The game was added to Steam Early Access in December 2013.
Full Release Date 23 November 2018.

References

External links
 

Dungeon management games
Indie video games
Indiegogo projects
Kickstarter-funded video games
Linux games
MacOS games
Science fiction video games
Simulation video games
Strategy video games
Survival video games
2018 video games
Video games developed in the United Kingdom
Video games set on fictional planets
Video games using procedural generation
Windows games
Fiction set around Tau Ceti